was a Japanese translator, best known for her translations of the works of modern Russian literature. She translated A Golden Cloudlet Was Sleeping by Anatoli Pristavkin (Japanese title ), The War Has Unfeminine Face and Zinc Boys by Svetlana Aleksiyevich and The Second Chechen War by Anna Politkovskaya in particular. Miura also translated into Russian  by Momoko Ishii.

Miura was an opponent of Russian military intervention in Chechnya.

Miura was born in Tokyo, and died of rectal cancer on 13 December 2012, aged 64, at her home in Tokyo. She was survived by her husband .

References

Translators to Japanese
Translators from Russian
1947 births
2012 deaths
Deaths from cancer in Japan
Deaths from colorectal cancer
20th-century Japanese translators